Bisla is a village in Shaheed Bhagat Singh Nagar district of Punjab State, India. The village is administrated by Sarpanch an elected representative of the village.

Demography 
As of 2011, Bisla has a total number of 298 houses and population of 1296 of which 640 include are males while 656 are females according to the report published by Census India in 2011. The literacy rate of Bisla is 79.83%, higher than the state average of 75.84%. The population of children under the age of 6 years is 111 which is 8.56% of total population of Bisla, and child sex ratio is approximately 1018 as compared to Punjab state average of 846.

Most of the people are from Schedule Caste which constitutes 57.25% of total population in Bisla. The town does not have any Schedule Tribe population so far.

As per the report published by Census India in 2011, 439 people were engaged in work activities out of the total population of Bisla which includes 367 males and 72 females. According to census survey report 2011, 100% workers describe their work as main work and 0% workers are involved in Marginal activity providing livelihood for less than 6 months.

Education 
Amardeep Singh Shergill Memorial college Mukandpur and Sikh National College Banga are the nearest colleges.

Transport 

See also 
List of villages in India

References

External links 
 Tourism of Punjab 
 Census of Punjab
 Locality Based PINCode

Villages in Shaheed Bhagat Singh Nagar district